Braathens Regional Airlines (BRA) is a Swedish airline founded in 2016 and one of the largest domestic airlines in Sweden. The company has its headquarters in Bromma, Stockholm.

History
BRA Braathens Regional Airlines was founded in 2016 with the purpose of uniting the previously distinct appearances of Malmö Aviation, Sverigeflyg and Braathens Regional and offer one single brand to the Swedish domestic market. BRA does not have an AOC and any aircraft of its own. Instead it uses the capacities of its sister companies Braathens Regional Airways and Braathens Regional Aviation.

In early April 2020, BRA suspended all flights between 6 April and 31 May in response to a sharp decrease in demand and the Swedish Government and Public Health Agency's recommendation that people not travel around the country. BRA filed in court for a debt restructuring on 6 April 2020, and ceased all operations until further notice.

Destinations

The following destinations are marketed by BRA as of September 2022:

Codeshare agreements
BRA Braathens Regional Airlines has codeshare agreements with the following airlines (as of February 2020):